Lake Como is an unincorporated community located in Putnam County, Florida, United States. The zip code is: 32157. The community is located along Old Highway 17 between Crescent City and Pomona Park. 

The community of Lake Como has been confused with Lake Como Family Park and Community/Coop which is about 130 miles to the southwest in Land O' Lakes, Florida in Pasco County, immediately north of Tampa.

Notes

Unincorporated communities in Putnam County, Florida
Unincorporated communities in Florida